Shimian Maifu may refer to:

Ambush from Ten Sides, a traditional Chinese music piece written for the pipa
The Hegemon-King Bids His Concubine Farewell, a traditional Chinese opera, known as Shimian Maifu in some regional opera forms
House of Flying Daggers, a 2004 Chinese film by Zhang Yimou

See also
Battle of Gaixia fought between Liu Bang (Han) and Xiang Yu (Chu) in 202 BC, from which this term derives